Bholahat is an upazila of Nawabganj District in the Division of Rajshahi, Bangladesh.

Geography
Its total area of 123.52 km2. The Indian border is surrounded on 3 sides by this Upazila. The Mahananda River, Bil Vatia and Mango garden divide this Upazila from India.

Bholahat Upazila is bounded by Old Malda CD Block in Malda district, West Bengal, India on the north, Habibpur CD Block in Malda district on the east, Shibganj and Gomostapur Upazilas on the south and English Bazar CD Block in Malda district, on the west.

Demographics

According to 2011 Bangladesh census, Bholahat had a population of 103,301. Males constituted 49.40% of the population and females 50.60%. Muslims formed 99.13% of the population, Hindus 0.85% and others 0.02%. Bholahat had a literacy rate of 47.17% for the population 7 years and above.

According to the 2001 Bangladesh census, Bholahat had a population of 92,149. Males constituted 50.58% of the population, and females 49.42%. There were 19,257 households. Bholahat had an average literacy rate of 39.22%, comprising a male literacy rate of 39.71% and female literacy rate of 38.74%.

Administration
Bholahat Upazila is divided into Bholahat Municipality and four union parishads: Bholahat, Daldoli, Gohalbari, and Jambaria. The union parishads are subdivided into 45 mauzas and 100 villages.

See also
Upazilas of Bangladesh
Districts of Bangladesh
Divisions of Bangladesh

References

External links

https://www.bholahat.com

Upazilas of Chapai Nawabganj District